Taylor Danielle Spreitler (born October 23, 1993) is an American actress. She is best known for her roles as Mia McCormick in the soap opera series Days of Our Lives (2009–2010), Lennox Scanlon in the sitcom Melissa & Joey (2010–2015) and Kendra Gable in the sitcom Kevin Can Wait (2016–2018).

Spreitler's films include the comedy 3 Day Test (2012), the action thriller The Contractor (2013) and the horror films Amityville: The Awakening (2017) and Leprechaun Returns (2018).

Personal life
Spreitler was born in Hattiesburg, Mississippi, spent her younger years in Wiggins, Mississippi, and then moved to Amory, Mississippi.

Career
Beginning her career as a model, Spreitler's first commercial audition was for a national campaign for Motrin. This was followed by a series of spots, including those for Jif, Hess, and Chuck E. Cheese. In 2009, Spreitler signed a three-year contract to play the role of Mia McCormick on the NBC daytime soap opera Days of Our Lives. In 2011, she was nominated for Best Performance in a Daytime TV Series by a Young Actress at the 32nd Young Artist Awards.

Spreitler starred as Lennox Scanlon, the niece of Melissa Joan Hart's character, in ABC Family's Melissa & Joey. In 2016, she was cast as Kendra Gable, the daughter of Kevin James' character, in the CBS sitcom Kevin Can Wait.

Spreitler co-starred with Bella Thorne and Thomas Mann in the 2017 horror film Amityville: The Awakening. She also starred in the 2018 horror comedy film Leprechaun Returns.

Filmography

References

External links

 

1993 births
21st-century American actresses
Actresses from Mississippi
American child actresses
American female models
American film actresses
American soap opera actresses
American television actresses
Living people
People from Hattiesburg, Mississippi
People from Wiggins, Mississippi
People from Amory, Mississippi